William A. Bell Sr. (born June 1, 1949) is an American politician who served as the 33rd mayor of Birmingham, Alabama, from 2010 to 2017. He had previously held the office on an interim basis in 1999. Prior to that, he had served several terms on the Birmingham City Council. He is a member of the Democratic Party.

Political career

Birmingham City Council
Bell was first elected to the Birmingham City Council in November 1979, and in 1985 became the first African-American selected to serve as council president.

Mayor
Bell was the only mayor in the city's history that brought in over 2 billion dollars of business development for Birmingham and was instrumental in overseeing the renaissance of Birmingham with projects that brought international recognition including the World Games, the Senior Games, Railroad Park, Regions Baseball Field, worked with President Obama and UNESCO in naming Birmingham a World Heritage site and National Park that also recognized Birmingham's Civil Rights History. Other Civil Rights historical landmarks that are included in Bell's visionary project include the Sixteenth Street Baptist Church, Bethel Baptist Church, the Birmingham Civil Rights Institute, the A.G. Gaston Motel and several other historical sites. Bell also led in the development of the Birmingham Sports Crossplex and over $300 million dollars in capital improvements for the Birmingham City School System and the University of Alabama in Birmingham, in spite of coming into office with a $77 million dollar deficit left by the prior administration. Bell grew the city of Birmingham reserves to over $350 million dollars when he left office.
  
On December 15, 2015, Bell was involved in a physical altercation with Councillor Marcus Lundy during a city council meeting. Both men were treated at a local hospital for minor injuries. Two days after the altercation, Bell and Lundy publicly apologized in a press conference.

Facing re-election, Bell finished second in the primary election on August 22, 2017 among twelve candidates and advanced to the general election. On October 3, 2017, Bell was defeated by former Birmingham Board of Education President Randall Woodfin.

After his loss, Bell appeared onstage at the Magic City Classic alongside T.I. and declared that Woodfin would take Birmingham "to the motherfucking top." Woodfin jokingly referenced the incident during his inaugural address a month later. Bell notably did not attend Woodfin's inauguration.

Personal life 
Bell is a Catholic Christian.

References 

Mayors of Birmingham, Alabama
African-American mayors in Alabama
Alabama Democrats
University of Alabama at Birmingham alumni
Living people
1949 births
Alabama city council members
21st-century American politicians
African-American Catholics
21st-century African-American politicians
20th-century African-American people
Candidates in the 2021 United States elections